This is a list of geographical features in the state of North Rhine-Westphalia, Germany.

Mountains 

 Eifel
 Sauerland
 Teutoburg Forest
 Weser Uplands
 Westerwald
 Wiehen Hills

Rivers 

 Eder
 Ems
 Ennepe
 Erft
 Lenne
 Lippe
 Rhine
 Ruhr
 Sieg
 Weser
 Wupper

Regions 

 Cologne Bight
 Neanderthal
 Ostwestfalen-Lippe
 Porta Westfalica
 Rhine-Ruhr
 Ruhr area
 Rhineland
 Westphalia

Cities 

see List of cities in Germany and List of cities in North Rhine-Westphalia by population

North Rhine-Westphalia-related lists
North Rhine-Westphalia
Geography of North Rhine-Westphalia